The 2002–03 Argentine Torneo Argentino A was the eighth season of third division professional football in Argentina. A total of 20 teams competed; the champion was promoted to Primera B Nacional.

Club information

Zone A

Zone B

Zone C

Zone D

Apertura 2002

First stage
In every round the bye team played against the bye team of the other zone: Team from Zone A vs Team from Zone B and Team from Zone C vs Team from Zone D.

Zone A

Zone B

Zone C

Zone D

Final stage

Note: The team in the first line plays at home the second leg.

Clausura 2003

First stage
In every round the bye team played against the bye team of the other zone: Team from Zone A vs Team from Zone B and Team from Zone C vs Team from Zone D.

Zone A

Zone B

Zone C

Zone D

Final stage

Note: The team in the first line plays at home the second leg.

Overall standings

Championship final

Promotion/relegation playoff B Nacional-Torneo Argentino A

 

CAI remained in the Primera B Nacional by winning the playoff.

Relegation playoff

|-
!colspan="5"|Relegation/promotion playoff 1

|-
!colspan="5"|Relegation/promotion playoff 2

Unión (S) was promoted to 2003–04 Torneo Argentino A by winning the playoff and Juventud Alianza was relegated to 2003–04 Torneo Argentino B.
Gimnasia y Esgrima (M) was promoted to 2003–04 Torneo Argentino A by winning the playoff and Independiente (VO) was relegated to 2003–04 Torneo Argentino B.

See also
2002–03 in Argentine football

References

Torneo Argentino A seasons
3